The Nanjing Union Theological Seminary is the flagship theological seminary of Protestant Christianity in China today. It is managed by the China Christian Council.

Prior to the founding of the People's Republic of China, the institution had its beginnings as Nanjing Theological Seminary, established in 1911. In November 1952, ten other theological seminaries in East China would join it to form Nanjing Union Theological Seminary. In 1961, Yanjing Union Theological Seminary of Beijing would likewise join, making a total of twelve seminaries which formed the new seminary.

Seminary during the Japanese occupation
During the massacre in Nanjing during December 1937, the pre-consolidated Nanjing Theological Seminary housed thousands of Chinese civilians in an effort to offer protection from the Japanese soldiers. However, Christian affiliated schools and seminaries suffered during the Japanese Invasion, and many were unofficially moved into unoccupied areas of Free China.

During the People's Republic of China 
In early 1952, the Three-Self Patriotic Movement worked to reform theological education. The new government saw Christianity as a potentially subversive power and seminaries lost funds from overseas denominations. Y. T. Wu was at the head of a committee to work towards the union of seminaries in East China. By November 1952, eleven theological seminaries from East China were incorporated as Nanjing Union Theological Seminary:

 Trinity Theological Seminary, Ningbo (宁波三一圣经学院)
 Central Theological Seminary, Shanghai (上海圣公会中央神学院)
 China Theological Seminary, Hangzhou (杭州中国神学院)
 China Baptist Theological Seminary, Shanghai (上海中华浸会神学院)
 Jiangsu Baptist Bible College, Zhenjiang (镇江浸会圣经学院)
 Ming Dao Bible Seminary, Jinan (济南明道圣经学院)
 Nanjing Theological Seminary (南京金陵神学院)
 North China Theological Seminary, Wuxi (无锡华北神学院)
 Minan Theological Seminary, Changzhou (漳州闽南神学院)
 Fujian Union Seminary, Fuzhou (福州福建协和神学院)
 Cheloo Theological Seminary, Jinan (济南齐鲁神学院)

In 1961, a twelfth institution joined the union, Yanjing Union Theological Seminary, Beijing (燕京协和神学院).

In December 1952, K. H. Ting was elected by the board of directors as the new principal. The union brought together a wide theological spectrum of instructors and students.

The seminary has long been the main center for training religious leaders, and was reopened as one of China's primary institutions for religious study in 1981.

Protestantism regained popularity in China during the 1980s, and the Nanjing Union Theological Seminary, which was the only graduate-level seminary at the time, began publishing the journals Nanjing Theological Review and  Religion (or Zongjiao), the latter in collaboration with the Nanjing University.

Historical figures and people associated with the Seminary
 Jin Mingri, pastor of Zion Church of Beijing, an independent Christian church in Beijing.
 Francis Wilson Price, American professor at the Seminary who remained at the Seminary throughout Japanese occupation
 John Leighton Stuart, professor of New Testament Literature and Exegesis and an American Missionary who remained in China during Japanese occupation
 Hubert Lafayette Sone, professor of Old Testament and American missionary during the occupation
 K. H. Ting, long-time president of the Seminary and Chinese Christian leader
 Wang Weifan, alumnus and professor of the seminary
 Y. T. Wu, founder of the Three-Self Patriotic Movement

References

External links
 Official site (in Chinese)
Frank Williston Papers 1924-1966 Collection includes correspondence concerning the Nanking Theological Seminary during the Nanking Massacre, December, 1937.

Protestant seminaries and theological colleges
Protestantism in China
Three-Self Patriotic Movement